The 1st Marine Infantry Regiment is a French regiment heir of the colonial infantry. The regiment is one of the  regiments of the Troupes de Marine, with the 2nd Marine Infantry Regiment 2e RIMa, the 3rd Marine Infantry Regiment 3e RIMa, as well the 4th Marine Infantry Regiment 4e RIMa (dissolved in 1998). Along with the 1st Marine Artillery Regiment 1er RAMa and the 2nd Marine Artillery Regiment 2e RAMa, the 1st Marine formed the Blue Division. The 1er RIMa is a light armoured unit, since 1986, alike with the régiment d'infanterie-chars de marine RICM.

Creating and different nominations 

Heir to the Compagnie Ordinaire de la Mer created in 1622 by Richelieu, the 1er RIMa was created by a Royal Decree in 1822 at the corps of the French Naval Ministry.

Designated as the 1st Colonial Infantry Regiment 1er RIC in 1900 at the creation of the colonial infantry at the corps of the Ministry of War, the regiment was redesignated as RIMa in 1958, when the colonial infantry was redesignated as marine infantry.

The evolution nomination of the corps:

 1822–1827: 1st Marine Infantry Regiment
 1854: 1st Marine Infantry Regiment, 2nd formation
 1870: 1st Marching Marine Infantry Regiment
 1900–1940: Designated as the 1st Colonial Infantry Regiment 1er RIC at the creation of colonial infantry at the corps of the Ministry of War.
 1941–1945: 4th Demi-Brigade DFL
 1945–1947: 1st Colonial Infantry Regiment
 1947–1948: 1st Colonial Infantry Battalion
 1948: 1st Colonial Infantry Regiment
 1958: redesignated as RIMa, when the colonial infantry rebecame marine infantry.

The regiment is heir to the 1st Free French Division and the battalion of the Pacific which combat engaged at Bir Hakeim. The Marine Infantry and Pacific Battalion was issued from the merger, in July 1942, of the 1st Marine Infantry Battalion and the Pacific Battalion.

History

Ancien Régime

Wars of the Revolution & Empire 
 1813: German Campaign of 1813
 October 16–19: Battle of Leipzig
 1814: Campaign of France
 February 14, 1814: Battle of Vauchamps

1815 to 1848 
In 1846, elements of the 1er RIMa were at Tahiti. The regiment was present in the battle of Fatahua (inscribed on the regimental colors of the 2e RIMa) of December 17, 1846 (3rd Company, Captain Masset).

Second Empire 
Crimean War, Franco-British campaign in the Baltic Sea
 1854 – Battle of Bomarsund
Second Opium War, Franco-British campaign
 1860 – Forts du Pei-Ho
Cochinchina Campaign
 1861 -Ki-Hao
French intervention in Mexico
 1863 – Puebla

War of 1870–1871
On August 17, 1870, the 1st Marching Marine Infantry Regiment was part of the Armée de Châlons (1870) of Marshal de MacMahon.
 With the 4th Marching Marine Infantry Regiment of colonel d'Arbaud, the 1er formed the first brigade under the orders of général Reboul. This 1re brigade, with the 2e brigade of général Martin des Pallières, three batteries of canons de 4, and one engineer company, constituted the 3rd Infantry Division commanded by division général Élie de Vassoigne. This infantry division evolved at the corps of 12th Army Corps with commander-in-chief Lebrun.
 August 23 to August 26 – March towards the east
 August 31, 1870 – Battle of Bazeilles

1870 to 1914 
During the Paris Commune in 1871, the regiment participated with the Armée Versaillaise.
 1878: Saint-Louis, Senegal
 1883: Tonkin Expedition
 Sơn Tây Campaign

World War I

Attachments 
 August 1914 – February 1916 3rd Colonial Infantry Division 3e DIC
In 1914, at the eve of the great war: the 2e, 3e, 7e and 1er RIC, were part of the 1st brigade under the orders of général Montignault, the 3rd colonial infantry division under the orders of général Raffanel.

The 3e DIC: Generals Raffanel, Leblond, Goulet (1914), Gadel (1915), Puypéroux (1916–1918). Engaged in the same sectors as the 2nd Colonial Infantry Division 2e DIC (4e, 8e, 24e R.I.C), to the first battle of Champagne (Ville-sur-Tourbe) and the second battle of Champaign (Ville-sur-Tourbe and Massiges). 

 February 1916 – November 1918 17th Colonial Infantry Division (France), 17e D.I.C

1914 
 August 22: Battle of Rossignol
 August 24: Saint-Vincent
 September 6–7: Battle of the Marne: Écriennes, Vauclerc

1915 
 July to August 1915: Operations in Argonne
 September 25 – October 6: Second Battle of Champagne, Souin, September 28 Somme-Py

1916 
 Macedonian front
 Disembarkation at Salonika in February 1916
 With the 17e D.I.C., Battle of Monastir

1917 
 April to May: Battle of the Crna Bend (1917)

1918 
 1918: Sokol, Battle of Dobro Pole, Kravitza
 September 15–18: Vetrenik
 September 23–24: Gradsko

Interwar period

World War II

Mobilization of coloniales troupes in 1939–1940 

On May 10, 1940, the 1st Colonial Infantry Regiment was under the command of colonel Fauchon and part of the 3rd Colonial Infantry Division which reinforced the sector of Montmédy.

The 3rd Colonial Division, général Falvy, consisted of the 1st, 21e, 23e R.I.C and 3e and 203e R.A.C.
The 3rd Colonial Division disappeared. The division immediately engaged the theatre, in the sector of Sun-sur-Meuse, Stenay, Martincourt, Aviot, Breux north of Verdun, at the level of cote 304 and Mort Homme, lieu of harsh combats in 1916–1917, where combats concentrated. On June 14, the 1er and 23e RIC were engaged in the ravine which separated cote 304 from Mort Homme. At 0630, the cote was crowned, despite a relentless resistance, the armoured contingents crossed the bridge of Bethoncout in direction of Esnes. The bridge was blown-up in the evening and redressed in the same night. The 1st company of the 1er RIC of captain Bertrand counter-attacked. At 17 hours, attacks were ceased. At 19 hours, the French Marines gave their part to other engagements.

Combats of free France 

The regiment was made compagnon de la Libération, June 28, 1945.

1945 to present 

The regiment was found in A.F.N from 1952 to 1962. Garrisoned in several places, the regiment was part of the 9th Brigade, then 9e DIMa, then 9e BLBMa.

The regiment was deployed to Lebanon at the corps of the Multinational Force in Lebanon in 1983, then United Nations Interim Force in Lebanon UNIFIL in 1984.

In July 2009, the regiment joined the 3rd Mechanised Brigade which became designated in March 2014 as 3rd Light Armoured Brigade.

The regiment has participated in all major operations of the French Army (Lebanon, Bosnia, Kosovo, Chad, Côte d'Ivoire, Central African Republic, Afghanistan). In 2010 members of the regiment were deployed in Guadeloupe and Djibouti or in operations in Kosovo and Afghanistan.

Organisation 
 Structure
 Escadron de commandement et de logistique - Command and Logistics squadron
 1er Escadron - 1st Armored Squadron
 2e Escadron - 2nd Armored Squadron
 3e Escadron - 3rd Armored Squadron
 4e Escadron - 4th Reconnaissance and Response Squadron
 5e Escadron - 5th Reserve Armored Squadron
 6e Escadron - 6th Reconnaissance and Response Squadron

Traditions 
The anniversary is celebrated for combats in Bazeilles, the village which was apprehended and abandoned four consecutive times under orders, respectively on August 31 and September 1, 1870.

 In the Name of God, vive la coloniale !

The Marsouins and the Bigors have for Saint, God. This war calling concludes intimate ceremonies which part life in the regiments. Often also at origin as an act of grace to Charles de Foucauld.

Motto

Insignia of the 1er RIMa

Regimental Colors

Decorations 

The regimental colors are decorated with:
 Légion d'honneur
 Croix de Guerre 1914–1918 with:
 2 palms
 Croix de Guerre 1939–1945 with:
 1 palm
 croix de la Valeur militaire with:
 1 silver star with 1 palm

Fourragère:
 The regiment is entitled to wear the fourragère bearing the colors of the croix de guerre 1914–1918.

Honours

Battle Honours 
 Bomarsund 1854
 Forts du Pei-Ho 1860
 Ki-Hoa 1861
 Puebla 1863
 Bazeilles 1870
 Sontay 1883
 La Marne 1914
 Champagne 1915
 Dobropolje 1918
 Tobrouk 1941
 Bir-Hakeim 1942
 Garigliano 1944
 Belfort 1944
 Authion 1945
 Afn 1952–1962

Regimental Commanders

1er RIMa (1822–1900) 
 1854: Colonel de Vassoigne.
 ...
 1870: Colonel Brière de l'Isle.
 ...
 01/10/1884–1885: Général Duchemin.
 ...
 1893: Colonel Boilève.

1er RIC (1900–1958) 
 1903: colonel Lalubin
 23/09/1913 – 12/09/1914: Général Guérin

1er RIMa (1958 – present)

Notable Officers & Marines 
 Joseph Gaudérique Aymerich, captain in the 1er RIMa in 1889.

References

Sources and bibliography 

 
 Erwan Bergot, 

Marines regiments of France
Armoured regiments of France
20th-century regiments of France
21st-century regiments of France
Angoulême
Military units and formations established in 1822